Jacques Chastenet de Castaing (20 April 1893, in Paris – 7 February 1978, in Paris) was a French journalist, historian and diplomat.

Le Temps, which first appeared on 25 April 1861, was a major moderate and liberal newspaper. After World War I (1914–18) it moved towards the right and the confederations of major French employers. In 1924 the paper opposed the Cartel des Gauches. Émile Mireaux and Jacques Chastenet were put in charge of the paper in 1931. Their diplomatic positions eventually became those of Great Britain. After the defeat of France in World War II (1939–45) the newspaper's distribution was restricted to the zone libre. It ceased publication on 29 November 1942 following the German invasion of the zone libre.

Chastenet was elected to the Académie française on 29 November 1956.

Bibliography
1918  Du Sénat constitué en Cour de Justice
1941  William Pitt  (Fayard)
1943  Godoy, Prince de la Paix  (Fayard)
1945  Vingt ans d’histoire diplomatique, 1919–1939  (Le Milieu du monde)
1945  Wellington  (Fayard)
1946  Le Parlement d’Angleterre  (Fayard)
1946  Les Grandes heures de Guyenne  (Colbert)
1947  Le Siècle de Victoria  (Fayard)
1948  Raymond Poincaré  (Julliard)
1949  La France de M. Fallières  (Fayard)
1952  Histoire de la IIIe République, Tome I. L’Enfance de la Troisième (1870–1879)  (Hachette)
1953  Elisabeth Ière  (Fayard)
1954  Histoire de la IIIe République, Tome II. La République des Républicains (1879–1893)  (Hachette)
1955  Histoire de la IIIe République, Tome III. La République triomphante (1893–1906)  (Hachette)
1956  Winston Churchill
1957  Histoire de la IIIe République, Tome IV. Jours inquiets et jours sanglants (1906–1918)  (Hachette)
1958  Quand le bœuf montait sur le toit
1960  Histoire de la IIIe République, Tome V. Les Années d’illusion (1918–*1931)  (Hachette)
1961  La vie quotidienne en Angleterre au début du Règne de Victoria, 1837–1851  (Hachette)
1962  Histoire de la IIIe République, Tome VI. Déclin de la Troisième (1931–1938)  (Hachette)
1963  Histoire de la IIIe République, Tome VII. Le drame final (1938–1940)  (Hachette)
1964  La guerre de 1914–1918  (Hachette)
1965  L’Angleterre d’aujourd’hui  (Calmann-Lévy)
1966  La vie quotidienne en Espagne au temps de Goya
1967  Histoire de l’Espagne
1967  En avant vers l’Ouest. La conquête des États-Unis par les Américains
1968  Léon Gambetta
1970  De Pétain à de Gaulle  (Fayard)
1970  Cent ans de République, 9 vol.  (Tallandier)
1974  Quatre fois vingt ans  (Plon)

References

Sources

External links
  L'Académie française

1893 births
1978 deaths
Writers from Paris
Members of the Académie Française
Grand Officiers of the Légion d'honneur
French male writers
20th-century French male writers